Alvin Reynolds (born June 24, 1959) is a former college and National Football League defensive backs coach.

Playing career
Reynolds attended Indiana State, where he played on the football team for four years. Over his career he appeared in 33 games recording five interceptions for 39 yards.

Coaching career

College career
After graduation, Reynolds began his coaching career in 1982. He was on the staff for the 1984 Indiana State football team, a team that was inducted into the Indiana State University Athletics Hall-of-Fame in 2012.

National Football League
In 1993, Reynolds joined the Denver Broncos coaching staff where he was an assistant defensive backs and quality control coach for three seasons. In 1996, he became the first defensive backs coach in Ravens history. He served in that position for three seasons. In 1999, he joined the Carolina Panthers as a defensive quality control and was also a defensive assistant for four seasons. After leaving the Panthers, he joined the coaching staff of the Jacksonville Jaguars where he served for five seasons as defensive backs coach from 2003 to 2007. He then joined the Atlanta Falcons in 2008, coaching the defensive backs until he was fired after the 2011 season.

In 2013, Reynolds guested with the Saskatchewan Roughriders.

References

External links
 ARHE profile

1959 births
Living people
American football defensive backs
Indiana State Sycamores football players
Indiana State Sycamores football coaches
Denver Broncos coaches
Baltimore Ravens coaches
Bentley Falcons football coaches
Carolina Panthers coaches
Jacksonville Jaguars coaches
Atlanta Falcons coaches
People from Pineville, Louisiana
Players of American football from Louisiana
Sportspeople from Rapides Parish, Louisiana